Robert Duncan MacPherson (born May 25, 1944) is an American mathematician at the Institute for Advanced Study and Princeton University. He is best known for the invention of intersection homology with Mark Goresky, whose thesis he directed at Brown University, and who became his life partner. MacPherson  previously taught at Brown University, the University of Paris, and the Massachusetts Institute of Technology. In 1983 he gave a plenary address at the International Congress of Mathematicians in Warsaw.

Education and career 
Educated at Swarthmore College and Harvard University, MacPherson received his PhD from Harvard in 1970.  His thesis, written under the direction of Raoul Bott, was entitled Singularities of Maps and Characteristic Classes. Among his many PhD students are Kari Vilonen and Mark Goresky.

Honors and awards 
In 1992, MacPherson was awarded the NAS Award in Mathematics from the National Academy of Sciences. In 2002 he and Goresky were awarded the Leroy P. Steele Prize for Seminal Contribution to Research by the American Mathematical Society. In 2009 he received the Heinz Hopf Prize from ETH Zurich. In 2012 he became a fellow of the American Mathematical Society.

Personal 
MacPherson's PhD advisee, Mark Goresky, later became his life partner. Their discovery of intersection homology made "both of them famous." After the collapse of the Soviet Union, they were instrumental in channeling aid to Russian mathematicians, especially many who had to hide their sexuality.

Selected publications
 Goresky, Mark; MacPherson, Robert, La dualité de Poincaré pour les espaces singuliers, C. R. Acad. Sci. Paris Sér. A-B 284 (1977), no. 24, A1549–A1551.  
 Goresky, Mark; MacPherson, Robert,  Intersection homology theory, Topology 19 (1980), no. 2, 135–162.  
 Goresky, Mark; MacPherson, Robert, Intersection homology. II, Inventiones Mathematicae 72 (1983), no. 1, 77–129.

References

External links

IAS page, including links to publications and CV
The work of Robert MacPherson

20th-century American mathematicians
21st-century American mathematicians
Topologists
Swarthmore College alumni
Institute for Advanced Study faculty
Brown University faculty
Academic staff of the University of Paris
Harvard University alumni
People from Lakewood, Ohio
1944 births
Living people
Members of the United States National Academy of Sciences
Fellows of the American Mathematical Society
Mathematicians from Ohio
LGBT mathematicians